Tricassa is a genus of spiders in the family Lycosidae. It was first described in 1910 by Simon. , it contains 2 African species.

References

Lycosidae
Araneomorphae genera
Spiders of Africa